The Unix System is a book by Stephen R. Bourne. Published in 1982, it was the first widely available general introduction to the Unix operating system. It included some historical material on Unix, as well as material on using the system, editing, the software tools concept, C programming using the Unix API, data management with the shell and awk, and typesetting with troff.

1982 non-fiction books
Addison-Wesley books
Computer books
Unix books